Shede Dev is a very old Shiva temple in Madhukar Nagar, Saphale, Palghar district, Maharashtra, India.

It is more than 100 years old.

There is huge function near the Temple at every Maha Shivaratri.

External links
Facebook page

Shiva temples in Maharashtra
Hindu temples in Maharashtra
Palghar district